Strive to Survive Causing Least Suffering Possible is an album by the anarchist punk band Flux of Pink Indians, first released in 1982 through their Spiderleg label. The album was later issued on compact disc through One Little Indian in 1989. It contained the entire Neu Smell EP as a bonus, however, the EP's tracks are in the incorrect order and are mislabelled. The album would later be repressed on vinyl through Let Them Eat Vinyl in 2008, and a deluxe two-disc LP and three-disc CD editions would be issued in 2013 through One Little Indian containing demos and live recordings.

Track listing

References

External links
 

1982 albums
Flux of Pink Indians albums